Chen Hsiu-lin (born 12 December 1973) is a Taiwanese footballer who played as a defender for the Chinese Taipei women's national football team. She was part of the team at the 1991 FIFA Women's World Cup. On club level she played for Jinwen College in Taiwan.

References

External links
 

1973 births
Living people
Taiwanese women's footballers
Chinese Taipei women's international footballers
Place of birth missing (living people)
1991 FIFA Women's World Cup players
Women's association football defenders